Hugh Henry Tate  (May 19, 1880 – August 7, 1956) was a Major League Baseball outfielder. He attended the University of Pennsylvania.

Sources

1880 births
1956 deaths
People from Everett, Pennsylvania
Major League Baseball outfielders
Washington Senators (1901–1960) players
Baseball players from Pennsylvania
Rock Island Islanders players
Shreveport Giants players
Dayton Veterans players
Sioux City Packers players
Marion Moguls players
Marion Diggers players
Louisville Colonels (minor league) players
Wheeling Stogies players
Canton Deubers players
Youngstown Steelmen players
Saginaw Ducks players